Virginia Williams (born March 18, 1978) is an American actress known for playing C.J Hargenberger in the Netflix sitcom Fuller House.

Early life
Williams first began her acting education in New York, earning a B.A. in Theatre Performance from Fordham University and later studying Shakespeare at Oxford University and at the British American Drama Academy in London.

Career
Williams made her professional acting debut in the ABC daytime soap One Life to Live as Lorna Van Skyver, a role she played from 1995 to 1996. She also played Brandy Taylor on the CBS daytime soap As the World Turns from 2001 to 2002. With that experience in daytime soaps, she parlayed her talents into several primetime roles, including the leading role of Bianca on Lifetime's Monarch Cove, Claudia on five episodes of the hit series How I Met Your Mother, Shelley Long's daughter, who was snubbed at the altar, in the film Honeymoon with Mom, and two seasons on Comedy Central's Strangers with Candy. She also played the role of Caitlin McNabb, who is a gold digger, in the 2010 ABC Family TV movie Revenge of the Bridesmaids.

Williams has performed guest starring roles and recurring characters on more than two dozen shows, including The Mentalist, Rules of Engagement, Better Off Ted, Lie to Me, In Plain Sight, Two and a Half Men, My Wife and Kids, Jack & Bobby, As the World Turns, Veronica Mars and Drop Dead Diva. She has also held lead roles on numerous television pilots for every major network. In 2011, she began portraying the role of Lauren Reed on the USA Network series Fairly Legal.

In 2016, Williams was featured in Mogul's #IAmAMogul campaign for "Inspiring women to rise higher, shine brighter, and give back", as part of Women's History Month in March. She also had a guest spot on the NCIS episode "Charade" as Leah Ramsey as well as playing C.J. of the Netflix sitcom Fuller House. From 2018 to 2019, she had a recurring role in the CW Reboot of Charmed as Charity Callahan, a powerful Elder and a friend to Harry Greenwood and the late Marisol Vera. She occasionally helps the Charmed Ones and Harry on their missions to help save those in need of protection.

Personal life
Williams married her husband, Bradford Bricken, a talent and literary manager, on December 31, 2007. They had their first child, a son named Bradford Powell, on November 19, 2015. Beau Rush was born on July 4, 2017.

Filmography

Film

Television

References

External links
 
 
 Virginia Williams at TV Guide

1978 births
American film actresses
American television actresses
Living people
Fordham University alumni
Alumni of the University of Oxford
20th-century American actresses
21st-century American actresses
Actresses from Memphis, Tennessee